The Puebla-Cholula Tourist Train was a tram-train railway line that connected the city centre of Puebla with the tourist zone in Cholula in Puebla State, Mexico. Operation began in January 2017 and ended in December 2021.

History
The project was announced in July 2015 by Puebla State Governor Rafael Moreno Valle Rosas.  Construction began in November 2015 and was completed in early 2017 when it was inaugurated by President Enrique Peña Nieto and Governor Moreno Valle.  Initially budgeted to cost 800 million pesos, final project costs totaled 1,113 million pesos.

Route
The  single-track route largely utilized existing rail rights-of-way to the north and west of Puebla City.  The route began at the Mexican National Railway Museum in Puebla's city centre.  The first  of the route operated as a tram line without any stops along city streets with mixed vehicle traffic.  The remainder of the route utilized a dedicated at-grade right-of-way from Puebla City to Cholula Station adjacent to the Cholula Archaeological Zone.  An additional two intermediate stops, Mercado Hidalgo Station and Momoxpan Station, were constructed but have not been opened.

Operations
The Puebla-Cholula Tourist Train's rolling stock consisted of two three-car diesel-electric -long trains supplied by Vossloh.  The trains have a capacity of 284 people.  Average train speed was 30km/hr and the approximate travel time between Puebla and Cholula was 40 minutes.  There were three daily departures from each terminal on weekdays and nine daily departures from each terminal on weekends and holidays.

Total passengers in 2019 numbered 161,377 users.

Operations ended on 31 December 2021 due to a lack of profitability.

References

Railway lines in Mexico
Puebla (city)
Light rail in Mexico
Railway lines opened in 2017
Railway services discontinued in 2021